The following is a timeline of the presidency of Donald Trump during the fourth and last quarter of 2019, from October 1 to December 31, 2019. To navigate quarters, see timeline of the Donald Trump presidency.

Overview

The fourth quarter of Donald Trump's presidency was largely dominated by his impeachment scandal.

Public opinion

Timeline

October 2019

November 2019

December 2019

See also
 Presidential transition of Donald Trump
 First 100 days of Donald Trump's presidency
 List of executive actions by Donald Trump
 List of presidential trips made by Donald Trump (international trips)

References

2019 Q4
Presidency of Donald Trump
October 2019 events in the United States
November 2019 events in the United States
December 2019 events in the United States
2019 timelines
Political timelines of the 2010s by year
Articles containing video clips